Leonard Francis Broderick (born October 11, 1938) is a Canadian former ice hockey goaltender. He is the brother of former professional hockey player Ken Broderick.

Born in Toronto, Ontario, Broderick played junior hockey with the Toronto Marlboros, with whom he recorded record-tying nine shutouts in the 1956-57 season, tying a record previously set by Glenn Hall. He was loaned to the Montreal Canadiens by the Marlboros to replace Jacques Plante, and played his one and only National Hockey League in a 6-2 win over his hometown Toronto Maple Leafs. He spent one more season with the Marlboros before playing senior hockey with the Oakville Oaks. He signed with the St. Paul Saints, but let in 16 goals in 3 games and retired soon after.

See also
 List of players who played only one game in the NHL

References

External links
 

1938 births
Living people
Canadian ice hockey goaltenders
Ice hockey people from Toronto
Montreal Canadiens players
St. Paul Saints (IHL) players
Toronto Marlboros players